Frida Gustavsson (born 6 June 1993) is a Swedish model and actress.

Career

Modelling

Gustavsson was discovered at an IKEA when she was 12 years old. She began modeling locally in 2008, and in the same year she moved to Japan to pursue modelling. She opened the Valentino Haute Couture fall 2012 show in Paris. Since then, she has walked shows for Shiatzy Chen, Louis Vuitton, Chanel, Lanvin, Carolina Herrera, Fendi, Christian Dior, Jil Sander, Alexander McQueen, Anna Sui, Marc Jacobs, Michael Kors, Calvin Klein, Oscar de la Renta, Emilio Pucci, Celine, Hermès, Jean Paul Gaultier, Dolce & Gabbana, Givenchy, Yves Saint Laurent, Ralph Lauren, Blumarine, and Versace. She also walked in the Victoria's Secret Fashion Show 2012. Gustavsson is also the new face of Maybelline, she was going to work for them in ads and commercials in the late 2013. She was the fourth most requested model of the spring 2010 season, behind Kasia Struss, Liu Wen, and Constance Jablonski.

Gustavsson has been in the magazines Elle, W, Numéro, American, Italian, French, British, German and Japanese Vogue, L'Officiel, Crash, and others. In March 2010, she appeared on the cover of the German Vogue. She has appeared in advertising campaigns for Marc Jacobs, Jill Stuart, Anna Sui, H&M, Max Mara, Tiger of Sweden and Prada. Gustavsson won Elle Sweden's Model of the Year award in 2011.

She appears in adverts for Nina Ricci.

After five years of break, she was walked for Jean Paul Gaultier Haute Couture Spring 2020 Show.

Acting
She has also expressed an interest in an acting career, stating in 2014 that she would like to move into theatre or film and auditioned for the role of Rey for Star Wars: The Force Awakens but did not get the part. 

Most recently, she stars as the great Viking warrior Freydis Eriksdotter in the new series "Vikings: Valhalla" directed by Jeb Stuart, airing on Netflix.

Personal life
In June 2011, Gustavsson graduated from St Martins Gymnasium in Sundbyberg, Sweden. 

She married photographer Hjalmar Rechlin on 30 May 2015 in Sweden.

Filmography

Television

References

External links 

 
 Frida Gustavsson at Style.com
 Frida Gustavsson at New York magazine
 Frida Gustavsson at Design Scene
 
 

1993 births
Living people
IMG Models models
Actresses from Stockholm
Swedish female models
21st-century Swedish actresses
Swedish film actresses
Swedish television actresses
Swedish expatriates in Japan